Charles Richard Sumner  (22 November 179015 August 1874) was a Church of England bishop.

Life
Charles Sumner was a brother of John Bird Sumner, Archbishop of Canterbury. Their father was Robert Sumner and their mother was Hannah Bird, a first cousin of William Wilberforce.

Sumner was educated at Eton College and Trinity College, Cambridge and graduated Bachelor of Arts (BA) in 1814 and Cambridge Master of Arts (MA) in 1817. After ordination he ministered for the two winters of 1814–1816 to the English congregation in Geneva. From 1816 to 1821 he was curate of Highclere, Hampshire. In 1820, George IV wished to appoint him as a canon of Windsor, but the prime minister, Robert Jenkinson, 2nd Earl of Liverpool, objected; Sumner received instead a royal chaplaincy and librarianship. Other preferments quickly followed; in 1826 he was consecrated Bishop of Llandaff (at that point the Bishop of Llandaff was also Dean of St Paul's Cathedral, London) and in 1827 Bishop of Winchester. In 1869 he resigned his seat, but continued to live at the official residence in Farnham until his death on 15 August 1874.

Though Evangelical in his views he did not confine his patronage to that school.

He and his brother were members of the Canterbury Association from 27 March 1848.

Works
Sumner published a number of charges and sermons and The Ministerial Character of Christ Practically Considered (London, 1824). He also edited and translated John Milton's De doctrina christiana, which was found in the State Paper office in 1823, and formed the text of Macaulay's essay on Milton.

Family
Sumner married Jennie Fanny Barnabine Maunoir (23 February 1794 – 3 September 1849) and had seven children - four sons and three daughters, including:
John Maunoir Sumner ( at Highclere – 1 April, 1886), rector of North Waltham 1842–1845, and of Buriton, Hampshire, 1845, until his death.  
Louisanna Sumner (1817–1899), who married the Rev. William Gibson, Rector of Fawley, Hampshire, and had eleven children including:
Arthur Sumner Gibson (1844–1927), a rugby union international, who played in the first international match in 1871
Edgar Charles Sumner Gibson, (1848–1924), Bishop of Gloucester
Alan George Sumner Gibson (1856–1922), Coadjutor Bishop of Cape Town from 1894
Sophia Albertina Sumner (1823–1884), married the Rev. William Henry Ridley 
George Henry Sumner (1824–1909), Bishop of Guildford, whose wife Mary founded the Mothers' Union
Emily Sarah Frances Sumner (1832–1926), who married Robert Newman Milford (1829–1913), Rector of East Knoyle, Wiltshire and canon of Salisbury Cathedral, whose children included Sir Humphrey Sumner Milford, a publisher at Oxford University Press

References

Attribution

; Endnotes:
A Life of Sumner was published by his son, George Henry Sumner, in 1876
 cf. Le Neve's Fasti, i. 49, ii. 257, 317, 429, iii. 21, 81
 Stapylton's Eton Lists, p. 42
 Lady Granville's Letters, i. 255
Burke's Landed Gentry
 
Gent. Mag. 1802 ii. 1066, 1847 i. 108
Times, 17 and 18 Aug 1874
 Guardian, 19 and 26 Aug 1874
 Pennington's Recollections, pp. 149–65
Ashwell and Wilberforce's Bishop Wilberforce, i. 65–82, 103–4, 150, 160, 263–4, 317, 401, ii. 248, iii. 61–2
Lucas's Bernard Barton, pp. 108–9, 161
 information from Mr. W. Aldis Wright

1790 births
1874 deaths
People educated at Eton College
Alumni of Trinity College, Cambridge
Bishops of Llandaff
Bishops of Winchester
People from Kenilworth
Deans of St Paul's
Burials at Winchester Cathedral
Members of the Canterbury Association
19th-century Church of England bishops
Evangelical Anglican bishops
English librarians
19th-century Welsh Anglican bishops
People from Highclere
18th-century Anglican theologians
19th-century Anglican theologians